Treppo Carnico is a frazione of Treppo Ligosullo in the Province of Udine in the Italian region Friuli-Venezia Giulia, located about  northwest of Trieste and about  northwest of Udine. It was a separate comune until Februar 1 2018, when it was merged with Ligosullo, which created the Treppo Ligosullo comune.

References

Cities and towns in Friuli-Venezia Giulia